Alexander Tiranoff (September 21, 1882 – January 1972) was an American painter. His work was part of the painting event in the art competition at the 1932 Summer Olympics.

References

1882 births
1972 deaths
20th-century American painters
American male painters
Olympic competitors in art competitions
Place of birth missing
20th-century American male artists